An election to Dinefwr Borough Council was held in May 1987.  It was preceded by the 1983 election and followed by the 1991 election. On the same day there were elections to the other local authorities and community councils in Wales.

Boundary changes
There were a number of boundary changes and some wards were renamed although remaining essentially unchanged.

Results

Betws (one seat)

Brynamman (one seat)

Cilycwm (one seat)

Cwmllynfell (one seat)

Cynwyl Gaeo(one seat)
The ward used to be known as Cynwyl Gaeo

Ffairfach (one seat)
The ward used to be known as Llandeilo Fawr South.

Garnant (two seats)
Boundary Change

Glanamman (two seats)
Boundary Change

Iscennen (one seat)
Boundary Change

Llandeilo Castle (one seats)
Boundary Change

Llandeilo Tywi (one seat)
Boundary Change

Llandovery Town (two seats)

Llandybie (three seats)
The ward used to be known as Llandybie and Heolddu.

Llanegwad (one seat)
The ward used to be known as Llanegwad and Llanfynydd .

Llangadog (one seat)
The ward used to be known as Llangadog and Llansadwrn.

Llangathen (one seat)
The ward used to be known as Llanfihangel Aberbythych and Llangathen

Llansawel(one seat)
The ward used to be known as Llansawel and Talley.

Manordeilo (one seat)
The ward used to be known as Llandeilo Fawr North

Myddfai (one seat)
The ward used to be known as Llanddeusant and Myddfai

Pantyffynnon (one seat)
Boundary Change

Penygroes (two seats)

Pontamman (one seat)
Boundary Change

Quarter Bach (one seat)
The ward used to be known as Glynamman

Saron (two seats)

Tirydail (one seat)
Boundary Change

References

Dinefwr Borough Council elections
Dinefwr Borough Council election